Ömer Lütfi Argeşo or Ömer Lütfü Argeşo (1879; (Istanbul) - December 16, 1942; Istanbul) was an officer of the Ottoman Army and of the Turkish Army. He served in the 1st cabinet of the Executive Ministers of Turkey in 1920-21.

Medals and decorations
Gallipoli Star (Ottoman Empire)
Silver Medal of Liyakat 
Prussia Iron Cross 2nd class
Medal of Independence with Red Ribbon and Citation

See also
List of high-ranking commanders of the Turkish War of Independence

Sources

1879 births
1942 deaths
Military personnel from Istanbul
Ottoman Military Academy alumni
Ottoman Military College alumni
Ottoman Army officers
Ottoman military personnel of World War I
Turkish Army officers
Turkish military personnel of the Greco-Turkish War (1919–1922)
Deputies of Afyonkarahisar
Recipients of the Silver Liakat Medal
Recipients of the Medal of Independence with Red-Green Ribbon (Turkey)
Recipients of the Iron Cross (1914), 2nd class